Locationes mansorum desertorum is a manuscript of Nicolaus Copernicus, written between 1516–1521. It is from ledgers handwritten by Copernicus when he was an economic administrator in Warmia.

Bibliography
 Mikołaj Kopernik, S. Grzybowski, wydanie II, Książka i wiedza, Warszawa 1973.
 Mikołaj Kopernik i jego epoka, J. Adamczewski, Interpress, Warszawa 1972.
 Kopernik, astronomia, astronautyka. Przewodnik encyklopedyczny. pod red. Włodzimierza Zonna, Warszawa, PWN, 1973.
 The Life of Copernicus (1473-1543), Pierre Gassendi, Oliver Thill

External links
 The Life of Copernicus 1473-1543

16th-century books
Locationes mansorum desertorum
Works by Nicolaus Copernicus